Chalkanoras Idaliou is a Cypriot football team currently playing in the Cypriot Second Division. The team was established in 1948 and is based in the village of Dali in Nicosia district. The club has played two seasons in the first division; in 1976–77 and 1977–78.

Current squad 

For recent transfers, see List of Cypriot football transfers summer 2017.

Achievements 
Cypriot Second Division Winners: 1
 1976
Cypriot Third Division Winners: 2
 1999, 2010
Cypriot Cup for lower divisions Winners: 1
 2010

References

External links 
 Official Website  

 
Football clubs in Cyprus
Association football clubs established in 1948
1948 establishments in Cyprus